Stacy Kranitz (born 1976) is an American photographer who works in the documentary tradition, currently living in the Appalachian Mountains of eastern Tennessee.

Life and work
Kranitz was born in Kentucky. She earned a BA at New York University Gallatin School of Individualized Study and a MA at the University of California, Irvine.

Since studying she has worked as an assignment photographer for magazines and newspapers such as National Geographic, Vanity Fair and The Atlantic.

Since 2009 Kranitz has been documenting the Appalachian region of America, whose inhabitants have been typecast as "down-and-out or undignified". She "lives in Appalachia and creates images from her perspective as a participant-observer, immersing herself in the lives of the individuals depicted." The series From The Study on Post-Pubescent Manhood shows young men at a dystopian compound in the Southern Ohio Appalachian region. Kranitz turns the "reckless, juvenile behavior [. . .] into activities imbued with symbolic importance, icons of social freedom. The lives and actions portrayed by her subjects are therefore simultaneously repellent and attractive." The series As it Was Give(n) to Me, made in Kentucky, North Carolina, Tennessee and Virginia is "a dialogue about stereotypes: the mythology they create, their value and their role in society." "Rather than portraying Appalachia as poverty-stricken or selectively focusing on its positive aspects, she sought to capture the complexity of rural, working-class life from a nuanced viewpoint."

Publications
The Louisiana Cockfighters Manual. New York: self-published, 2010. Edition of 100 copies.
From the Study on Post-Pubescent Manhood. Canada: Straylight, 2013. Edition of 100 copies.
Speak Your Piece. Here, 2016. . Edition of 300 copies.
The Great Divide. Lightworks, 2017. With Zoe Strauss. 64-page zine.
As it Was Give(n) to Me. Twin Palms, 2022. .

Awards
2015: Time's Instagram Photographer of the Year
2020: Guggenheim Fellowship from the John Simon Guggenheim Memorial Foundation

Collections
Kranitz's work is held in the following permanent collections:
Museum of Fine Arts, Houston, TX: 3 prints (as of 3 July 2022)
Harvard Art Museums, Cambridge, Massachusetts: 7 prints (as of 3 July 2022)

References

External links

Documentary photographers
21st-century American photographers
Photographers from Kentucky
American women photographers
University of California, Irvine alumni
New York University Gallatin School of Individualized Study alumni
1976 births
Living people
Women photojournalists